The Colubrinae are a subfamily of the family Colubridae of snakes. It includes numerous genera, and although taxonomic sources often disagree on the exact number, The Reptile Database lists 717 species in 92 genera as of September 2019. It is the second largest subfamily of colubrids, after Dipsadinae. Many of the most commonly known snakes are members of this subfamily, including rat snakes, king snakes, milk snakes, vine snakes, and indigo snakes.

Colubrine snakes are distributed worldwide, with the highest diversity in North America, Asia, northern Africa, and the Middle East. There are relatively few species of colubrine snakes in Europe, South America, Australia, and southern Africa, and none in Madagascar, the Caribbean, or the Pacific Islands.

Colubrine snakes are extremely morphologically and ecologically diverse. Many are terrestrial, and there are specialized fossorial (e.g. Tantilla) and arboreal (e.g. Oxybelis) groups, but no truly aquatic groups. Some of the most powerful constrictors (e.g. Pantherophis, Pituophis, Lampropeltis) are members of this group, as are a few snakes that have strong enough venom to kill humans (i.e. boomslangs [Dispholidus] and twigsnakes [Thelotornis]).

Within Colubrinae, genera and species seem to make up five distinct radiations that are to varying degrees broadly similar in terms of ecology and geographic distribution, although increased sampling is needed to determine whether all species currently placed in Colubrinae fit into one of these groups. These correspond roughly to the historically recognized tribe names Sonorini, Colubrini, Boigini/Lycodontini, Dispholidini, and Lampropeltini.

Coluber is the type genus of both Colubrinae and Colubridae and the basis for the name Colubroidea, and it is one of only three snake genera named by Carl Linnaeus still in use for a snake today.

Genera 

A group of 4 genera historically placed in Colubrinae have recently been called a separate subfamily, Ahaetullinae, in a few analyses. These are Ahaetulla Link, 1807, Chrysopelea Boie, 1827, Dendrelaphis Boulenger, 1890, and Dryophiops Boulenger, 1896.

 Aeluroglena Boulenger, 1898
 Aprosdoketophis Wallach, Lanza & Nistri, 2010
 Archelaphe Schulz, Böhme & Tillack, 2011
 Argyrogena Werner, 1924
 Arizona Kennicott, 1859
 Bamanophis Schätti & Trape, 2008
 Bogertophis Dowling & Price, 1988
 Boiga Fitzinger, 1826
 Cemophora Cope, 1860
 Chapinophis Campbell & Smith, 1998
 Chironius Fitzinger, 1826
 Coelognathus Fitzinger, 1843
 Coluber Linnaeus, 1758
 Colubroelaps Orlov, Kharin, Ananjeva, Thien Tao & Quang Truong, 2009
 Conopsis Günther, 1858
 Coronella Laurenti, 1768
 Crotaphopeltis Fitzinger, 1843
 Dasypeltis Wagler, 1830
 Dendrophidion Fitzinger, 1843
 Dipsadoboa Günther, 1858
 Dispholidus Duvernoy, 1832
 Dolichophis Gistel, 1868
 Drymarchon Fitzinger, 1843
 Drymobius Fitzinger, 1843
 Drymoluber Amaral, 1929
 Eirenis Jan, 1862
 Elachistodon Reinhardt, 1863—subsumed by Boiga
 Elaphe Fitzinger in Wagler, 1833
 Euprepiophis Fitzinger, 1843
 Ficimia Gray, 1849
 Geagras Cope, 1876
 Gonyosoma Wagler, 1828
 Gyalopion Cope, 1860
 Hapsidophrys Fischer, 1856
 Hemerophis Schätti & Utiger, 2001
 Hemorrhois Boie, 1826
 Hierophis Fitzinger, 1843
 Lampropeltis Fitzinger, 1843
 Leptodrymus Amaral, 1927
 Leptophis Bell, 1825
 Liopeltis Fitzinger, 1843
 Lycodon Fitzinger, 1826
 Lytorhynchus Peters, 1862
 Macroprotodon Guichenot, 1850
 Masticophis Baird & Girard, 1853
 Mastigodryas Amaral, 1935
 Meizodon Fischer, 1856
 Mopanveldophis Figueroa et al., 2016
 Muhtarophis Avcı, Ilgaz, Rajabizadeh, Yılmaz, Üzüm, Adriaens, Kumlutaş & Olgun, 2015
 Oligodon Fitzinger, 1826
 Oocatochus Helfenberger, 2001
 Opheodrys Fitzinger, 1843
 Oreocryptophis Utiger, Schätti & Helfenberger, 2005
 Orientocoluber Kharin, 2011
 Oxybelis Wagler, 1830
 Palusophis 
 Pantherophis Fitzinger, 1843
 Persiophis Rajabizadeh, Pyron, Nazarov, Poyarkov, Adriaens, & Herrel, 2020
 Philothamnus Smith, 1840
 Phrynonax Cope, 1862
 Phyllorhynchus Stejneger, 1890
 Pituophis Holbrook, 1842
 Platyceps Blyth, 1860
 Pseudelaphe Mertens & Rosenberg, 1943
 Pseudoficimia Bocourt, 1883
 Ptyas Fitzinger, 1843
 Rhamnophis Günther, 1862
 Rhinobothryum Wagler, 1830
 Rhinocheilus Baird & Girard, 1853
 Rhynchocalamus Günther, 1864
 Salvadora Baird & Girard, 1853
 Scaphiophis Peters, 1870
 Scolecophis Fitzinger, 1843
 Senticolis Campbell & Howell, 1965
 Simophis Peters, 1860
 Sonora Baird & Girard, 1843
 Spalerosophis Jan, 1865
 Spilotes Wagler, 1830
 Stegonotus Duméril, Bibron & Duméril, 1854
 Stenorrhina Duméril, 1853
 Stichophanes Wang, Messenger, Zhao & Zhu, 2014
 Symphimus Cope, 1869
 Sympholis Cope, 1861
 Tantilla Baird & Girard, 1853
 Tantillita Smith, 1941
 Telescopus Wagler, 1830
 Thelotornis Smith, 1849
 Thrasops Hallowell, 1857
 Toxicodryas Hallowell, 1857
 Trimorphodon Cope, 1861
 Wallaceophis Mirza, Vyas, Patel & Sanap, 2016
 Wallophis Werner, 1929
 Xenelaphis Günther, 1864
 Xyelodontophis Broadley & Wallach, 2002
 Zamenis Wagler, 1830

References

External links

Colubrids
Taxa named by Nicolaus Michael Oppel
Snake subfamilies